In Inuit mythology, Nujalik is the goddess of hunting on land.

For reference, Sedna is the goddess of sea hunting (whaling, fishing, etc.).

Inuit goddesses
Hunting goddesses